Morbid Fascination of Death is the third studio album by the Norwegian black metal band Carpathian Forest. It was released in 2001 by Avantgarde Music, and it was the last album to feature guitarist and founding member Johnny "Nordavind" Krøvel on the band's line-up. It was also their last studio album to be released by Avantgarde before they switched to Season of Mist.

It was re-released in 2007 by Peaceville Records under digipack form, with two bonus tracks.

The track "Carpathian Forest" is a re-recorded version of the eponymous track present in their debut EP, Through Chasm, Caves and Titan Woods.

Track listing

Personnel
Carpathian Forest
 Roger Rasmussen (Nattefrost) — vocals, guitars, synthesizer, choir on "Fever, Flames and Hell"
 Anders Kobro — drums, percussion
 Daniel Vrangsinn — bass, synthesizer
 Terje Vik Schei (Tchort) — bass
 Johnny Krøvel (Nordavind) — guitars, synthesizer, choir on "Fever, Flames and Hell"

Session musicians
 C. Alucard — speech on "Morbid Fascination of Death"
 Nina Hex — female backing vocals on "Doomed to Walk the Earth as Slaves of the Living Dead"
 Eivind Kulde — backing vocals on "Knokkelmann" and "Carpathian Forest"
 Arvid Thorsen (Mötorsen) — tenor saxophone on "Cold Comfort" and "Nostalgia"

Other staff
 E. Øvestad — artwork (logo)
 Lorenzo Mariani — cover art
 Roxy Ueland — photography
 Terje Refsnes — engineering, production

2001 albums
Carpathian Forest albums
Avantgarde Music albums